Monroyo or Mont-roig de Tastavins is a municipality located in the Matarraña/Matarranya comarca, province of Teruel, Aragon, Spain. According to the 2004 census (INE), the municipality has a population of 324 inhabitants.

See also
Matarraña/Matarranya

References

Municipalities in the Province of Teruel
Matarraña/Matarranya